Taker may refer to:

Eminent domain
The Undertaker (born 1965), American professional wrestler and actor
Undertaker, a funeral director
Takers, 2010 American film
Houston Takers, American Basketball Association team
The Taker/Tulsa, 1971 album by Waylon Jennings

See also
Take (disambiguation)
Acquisition (disambiguation)
Census taker (disambiguation)
Makers and Takers, 2008 book by Peter Schweizer
Givers and Takers, 1988 song Craig Bickhardt
Takers and Leavers, EP by Dr. Dog